Eilema triplaiola is a moth of the  subfamily Arctiinae. It is found in Angola and the Democratic Republic of Congo.

References

triplaiola
Insects of the Democratic Republic of the Congo
Insects of Angola
Moths of Africa